Marie Clothilde Balfour (20 October 1862 – September 1931) was a British writer, translator, and folklorist. She wrote three novels, stories, and plays; translated poetry and a French Revolution-era memoir; collected folk stories and songs; and edited two volumes of letters from her aunt.

Early life and education 
Balfour was born in Edinburgh, the daughter of James Balfour, a noted engineer, and Christina Simson Balfour (later Nicholson). Writer Robert Louis Stevenson was her first cousin. She spent her early years in New Zealand while he father was working there; when he died in 1869, she returned to Scotland with her mother.

Publications 
Balfour wrote three novels, translated a French Revolution-era memoir, and edited two volumes of letters from her aunt, Margaret Isabella Balfour Stevenson, sent during her travels with her son in Polynesia. She also wrote plays and stories, and collected folklore. "From time to time doubts have been expressed about the authenticity of the tales that Marie Clothilde Balfour said she had collected," notes one scholar, because the tales she published were especially strange, and she certainly added her own literary flourishes.

 "Legends of the Cars" (1891, a series of articles)
 White Sand (1896, novel)
 Maris Stella (1896, novel)
 "Sub Tegmine Fagi" (1897, short story)
 The Fall of the Sparrow (1897, novel)
 "Saint Joseph and Mary, from a French folk song" (1897, poem translated by Balfour)
 From Saranac to the Marquesas and beyond; being letters written by Mrs. M. I. Stevenson during 1887–88, to her sister, Jane Whyte Balfour (1903, edited by Balfour)
 Examples of printed folk-lore concerning Northumberland (1904, collected folksongs)
 Memoirs of Mlle des Écherolles, being sidelights on the Reign of Terror (1904, translated by Balfour)
 Mrs. M. I. Stevenson, Letters from Samoa, 1891–1895 (1906, edited by Balfour)

Personal life 
Balfour married her first cousin, physician James Craig Balfour; they had a daughter, Marie Margaret Melville Balfour, who also became a writer. Balfour's husband died in 1907, and she died in London in 1931.

References

External links 

 Maureen James, "Marie Clothilde Balfour - Biography", Telling History, a blog post about Balfour.
 Maureen James, "Investigating the 'Legends of the Carrs': a study of the tales as printed in 'Folk-lore' in 1891" (Ph.D. thesis, University of Glamorgan 2013).

 "The Buried Moon", Tales of Britain and Ireland, a podcast episode in which one of Balfour's folklore-based stories is read and discussed by the host Graeme Cooke.
 "The Buried Moon or the Big Plum Conspiracy" Hestia's Kitchen (28 September 2020), a blog post about Balfour's "The Buried Moon", with a recipe for plumbread

1862 births
1931 deaths
British women writers
British folklorists
British translators
People from Edinburgh